Fallen Leaf Lake, once called Dead Lake, is a lake in Camas, Washington. Once home to Dead Lake Cemetery, its graves were moved to Camas Cemetery in 1984.

This property had been owned by the local Camas paper mill for decades. Most recently, the mill was owned by the Georgia-Pacific Corporation, a subsidiary of Koch Industries, Inc. In 2011, the property surrounding Fallen Leaf Lake was purchased from Koch RP Holdings I, LLC by the City of Camas, Washington for use as a city park.

References

Camas, Washington
Lakes of Clark County, Washington
Lakes of Washington (state)